This is the discography for American blues rock band Blues Traveler.

Studio albums

Live albums

Compilation albums

Singles

Music videos

Other appearances

Notes

References 

Discographies of American artists
Rock music group discographies